Adad-Nirari or H̱addu-Nirari, was a king of Qatna in the 14th century BC.

Reign
Adad-Nirari is an Akkadian name. The king reigned for 45 years in the 14th century BC, and was mentioned in the inventories of Ninegal, found in Qatna. A tablet from Qatna records him stationing an army of chariot archers in the city of Tukad, in Mount Lebanon. The name of his queen was Pizallum.

Identity
Michael Astour suggested identifying Adad-Nirari with Adad-Nirari of Nuhašše; a hypothesis supported by Thomas Richter, who believes that Adad-Nirari ruled Qatna through a šakkanakku (military governor) called Lullu, citing that the latter's name appears in the Qatanite inventories at the time of Adad-Nirari. According to Richter, Adad-Nirari of Nuhašše ruled the second Syrian power after Mitanni, and was removed by the Hittites which gave Qatna back its independence.

This theory is debated; the Shattiwaza treaty between Mitanni and the Hittites mentioned Qatna independently from Nuhašše during the Hittite king Šuppiluliuma I's first Syrian war; If Qatna was part of the Nuhaššite kingdom, its submission to the Hittites would not have been mentioned separately. Jacques Freu rejected Richter's hypothesis; citing different arguments, he concluded that Adad-Nirari of Nuhašše was a contemporary of Idadnda of Qatna who ruled during the first Syrian war, a successor of the Qatanite Adad-Nirari.

References

Citations

Sources

14th-century BC rulers
Qatna
14th-century BC people